Masip is a Spanish surname. Notable people with this surname include:

 Antonio Masip Hidalgo (born 1946), Spanish politician
 Enric Masip (born 1969), Spanish handball player
 Jordi Masip (born 1989), Spanish football player
 Paulino Masip (1899–1963), Spanish playwright
 Vicente Juan Masip (1507–1579), Spanish painter
 Vicente Masip (1475–1545), Spanish painter
 Xavier Grau i Masip (1951–2020), Spanish painter